The Quzhou-Lanke Cup is a Go competition in China.

Outline
The Quzhou-Lanke Cup is sponsored by the Chinese Weiqi Association and the Sports Administration of Zhejiang Province. As of 2011, it was the most prestigious Chinese tournament, paying 500,000 Yuan ($77,000) to the winner.

Past winners and runners-up

References

Go competitions in China